In enzymology, an IMP cyclohydrolase is an enzyme that catalyzes the chemical reaction

IMP + H2O  5-formamido-1-(5-phospho-D-ribosyl)imidazole-4-carboxamide

Thus, the two substrates of this enzyme are IMP and H2O, whereas its product is 5-formamido-1-(5-phospho-D-ribosyl)imidazole-4-carboxamide.

This enzyme belongs to the family of hydrolases, those acting on carbon-nitrogen bonds other than peptide bonds, specifically in cyclic amidines.  The systematic name of this enzyme class is IMP 1,2-hydrolase (decyclizing). Other names in common use include inosinicase, and inosinate cyclohydrolase.  This enzyme 
catalyses the cyclisation of 5-formylamidoimidazole-4-carboxamide ribonucleotide to IMP, a reaction which is important in de novo purine biosynthesis in archaeal species.

Structural studies

In most cases this single-domain protein is arranged to form an overall fold that consists of a four-layered alpha-beta-beta-alpha core structure. The two antiparallel beta-sheets pack against each other and are covered by alpha-helices on one face of the molecule. The protein is structurally similar to members of the N-terminal nucleophile (NTN) hydrolase superfamily. A deep pocket was in fact found on the surface of IMP cyclohydrolase in a position equivalent to that of active sites of NTN-hydrolases, but an N-terminal nucleophile could not be found. Therefore, it is thought that this enzyme is structurally but not functionally similar to members of the NTN-hydrolase family.

References

Further reading
 

Protein domains
EC 3.5.4
Enzymes of known structure